Little York is an unincorporated community located along the border of Alexandria and Holland townships in Hunterdon County, New Jersey, United States. Little York has a post office with ZIP code 08834.

History
The Upper General Store was built  and shows Federal architecture influences. The Little York Tavern, also historically known as the Franklin House, was built 1838–41, but is now of modern construction.

Historic district

The Little York Historic District is a  historic district encompassing the community along County Route 614 and Sweet Hollow Road. It was added to the National Register of Historic Places on August 4, 1988 for its significance in architecture, exploration/settlement, and industry. The district includes 69 contributing buildings, 11 contributing structures, and 6 contributing sites.

Several mills were built along the Hakihokake Creek flowing through the community. At the Upper Mill site, an oil mill was built  and a grist mill . At the Lower Mill site, a grist mill was built .

The Alexandria Presbyterian Church Chapel was built in 1844 using the frame of the 1795 Presbyterian Church in Mount Pleasant. It features vernacular Greek Revival style. The house with Italianate/Gothic Revival influences at 531 Spring Mills Road was built  and remodeled . The house with Greek Revival and Victorian embellishment at 1 Little York-Pattenburg Road was built .

Transportation
County Route 614 (Spring Mills Road, Little York Road) runs east-west through the community and intersects with County Route 631 (Little York-Mount Pleasant Road), which runs north-south.

See also
 National Register of Historic Places listings in Hunterdon County, New Jersey

References

External links
 
 

Alexandria Township, New Jersey
Holland Township, New Jersey
Unincorporated communities in Hunterdon County, New Jersey
Unincorporated communities in New Jersey